All at Once is the second studio album by American indie-rock band The Airborne Toxic Event. The album was released on April 26, 2011, by Island Records.

Content 
The band contrasted the material on the album with the material on its first album, which songwriter Mikel Jollett described as consisting entirely of "sad songs about girls." All at Once, by contrast, contains "only three sad songs about girls." The material features expanded use of keyboards and is louder in many parts, but also contains acoustic songs. All the songs were described as autobiographical except "Welcome to Your Wedding Day," which was penned in response to the Deh Bala wedding party bombing. "All those people died and then everyone was on the news like, 'I don't understand why they don't appreciate our presence,'" Jollett said. "That's not really autobiographical as much as it is about how it's stupid to think people would be thankful for you bombing them."

Track listing

Personnel 
 Mikel Jollett – vocals, guitar, keyboards
 Steven Chen – lead guitar, keyboards
 Anna Bulbrook – keyboards, viola, backing vocals
 Noah Harmon – bass
 Daren Taylor – drums

References 

2011 albums
The Airborne Toxic Event albums
Island Records albums
Albums produced by Dave Sardy